Cosign is an open-source project originally designed by the Research Systems Unix Group to provide the University of Michigan with a secure single sign-on web authentication system.

Cosign authenticates a user on the web server and then provides an environment variable for the user's name. When the user accesses a part of the site that requires authentication, the presence of that variable allows access without having to sign on again.

Cosign is part of the National Science Foundation Middleware Initiative (NMI) EDIT software release.

See also 
 Central Authentication Service
 Pubcookie
 Stanford WebAuth
 University of Minnesota CookieAuth
 Shibboleth (Internet2)

External links 
 cosign homepage
 cosign Wiki

Computer security software
Federated identity